The West Virginia Republican Party is the affiliate of the United States Republican Party in West Virginia. Elgine McArdle is the party chair. It is currently the dominant party in the state, controlling all both of West Virginia's U.S. House seats, one of the U.S. Senate seats, both houses of the state legislature, and the governorship.

History
The Republican Party arose in 1854. The Democratic Party was an advocate of slavery and the Republican Party opposed it. There was a lot of turmoil in Virginia with the rise of the Republican Party. When the American Civil War reached Western Virginia, there was a rise in violence against those who opposed slavery. In May 1861, people traveled to Richmond, Virginia, to vote on secession of the state. Many Republicans had to leave the city because of the threats. Those who fled and others who lived in Western Virginia went to Wheeling to create their own government and began creating a new state, in which they were successful.

The Civil War helped the Republican Party gain recognition in the state. The Civil War in West Virginia often split families apart. The Boggs family lived in Pendleton County and one son was the head of the Confederate County Court while another son was the head of the Union Home guards in the north. Today, the northern party of Pendleton County is still strongly Republican. Republicans in Hampshire and Hardy counties left after the war to form Mineral and Grant counties, which are still primarily Republican. Republicans held the control in the state until the 1870s and the Confederates began voting and holding offices. In the 1870s, the party was so weak that it endorsed a Democratic governor.

Major Nathan Goff Jr. a veteran of the Civil War restructured the party. He was able to get the party to raise money and voters and recruit leaders. He led the party until the 1880s. He ran for governor in 1888 and was defeated by Aretas B. Fleming despite having more votes. The Republicans were the dominant party until the Great Depression. From the Great Depression until 2014, Democrats  controlled the state.

Arch Moore Jr. was elected the Republican governor in the 1960s. In 1985, Moore helped raise money and supervised recovery efforts for the flood of 1985. The state voted for Bush in 2000 and 2004. Betty Ireland was also elected as Secretary of State in 2004.

In the 2014 elections, the West Virginia Republican Party made major gains in West Virginia, capturing one of its two Senate seats, all of its congressional House seats for the first time since 1921, and gained control of both the West Virginia House of Delegates and the West Virginia Senate for the first time in 80 years. In the 2016 elections, the Republicans held on to their seats and made gains in the State Senate and gained three statewide offices.

In March 2019, the West Virginia GOP was embroiled in national controversy when a poster linking Democratic Rep. Ilhan Omar, a Muslim member of Congress, to the 9/11 attacks was displayed at the state capitol.

Current elected officials
The West Virginia Republican Party hold both of the state's two U.S. House seats. Incumbent governor Jim Justice who was elected as a Democrat in 2016, switched to the Republican Party in August 2017.

As of January 3, 2023:

Members of Congress

U.S. Senate

U.S. House of Representatives

Statewide office (State Board of Public Works) 
 Governor: Jim Justice (Formerly Democratic, later Republican since 2017)
 President of the Senate/Lt. Governor: Craig Blair
 Attorney General: Patrick Morrisey
 Auditor: JB McCuskey
 Secretary of State: Mac Warner
 Agriculture Commissioner: Kent Leonhardt

State legislative leadership

Senate 
President: Craig Blair
President pro tempore: Donna Boley
Majority Leader: Tom Takubo
Majority Whip: Ryan Weld

House of Delegates 
Speaker of the House: Roger Hanshaw
Speaker pro tempore: Paul Espinosa
Majority Leader: Eric Householder
Majority Whip: Marty Gearheart

Recent electoral history

References

External links
West Virginia Republican Party website

West Virginia
Republican Party